The Raincoats are a British band.

The Raincoats may also refer to:
 The Raincoats (album), debut album by The Raincoats
 "The Raincoats" (Seinfeld), Seinfeld TV episode
 Raincoat, clothing

Music
 "Raincoat", a song by Timeflies and Kira Kosarin